KXTQ-CD (channel 46) is a low-power, Class A television station in Lubbock, Texas, United States, affiliated with the Spanish-language Telemundo network. It is owned by Gray Television alongside NBC affiliate KCBD (channel 11), Wolfforth-licensed CW+ affiliate KLCW-TV (channel 22) and three other low-power stations—MyNetworkTV affiliate KMYL-LD (channel 14), Heroes & Icons affiliate KABI-LD (channel 42), and MeTV affiliate KLBB-LD (channel 48). Gray also provides certain services to Fox affiliate KJTV-TV (channel 34) and low-power Class A independent KJTV-CD (channel 32) under a shared services agreement (SSA) with SagamoreHill Broadcasting. The stations share studios at 98th Street and University Avenue in south Lubbock, where KXTQ-CD's transmitter is also located.

KXTQ-CD produces newscasts at 5 p.m. and 10 p.m. Monday through Friday; they are the only local Spanish-language productions in the market.

External links

Telemundo network affiliates
XTQ-CD
1991 establishments in Texas
Spanish-language television stations in Texas
Television channels and stations established in 1991
Gray Television
Low-power television stations in the United States